Francesco Schisano (born 3 August 1991) is an Italian lightweight rower. He won a gold medal at the 2013 World Rowing Championships in Chungju with the lightweight men's eight.

Achievements

References

1991 births
Living people
Italian male rowers
World Rowing Championships medalists for Italy